Pamenos Avorsant Ballantyne (born 9 December 1973 in Sandy Bay) is a long-distance runner from Saint Vincent and the Grenadines. He represented his country in the marathon at two consecutive Summer Olympics starting in 1996.

His brother, Benedict Ballantyne, was also a long-distance runner.

Competition record

Personal bests
1500 metres – 4:01.8 (Castries 1993)
5000 metres – 14:31.5 (London 1998) NR
10,000 metres – 29:58.3 (Derby 1998) NR
10 kilometres – 29:49 (Bridgetown 1999) NR
15 kilometres – 53:18 (La Joya 2011)
Half marathon – 1:05:43 (Toronto 2002) NR
Marathon – 2:15:30 (Port-of-Spain 2003) NR OECS record

References

External links
 

1973 births
Living people
Saint Vincent and the Grenadines male middle-distance runners
Saint Vincent and the Grenadines male long-distance runners
Athletes (track and field) at the 1996 Summer Olympics
Athletes (track and field) at the 2000 Summer Olympics
Athletes (track and field) at the 1994 Commonwealth Games
Athletes (track and field) at the 2002 Commonwealth Games
Athletes (track and field) at the 2010 Commonwealth Games
Athletes (track and field) at the 2003 Pan American Games
Olympic athletes of Saint Vincent and the Grenadines
Pan American Games competitors for Saint Vincent and the Grenadines
Commonwealth Games competitors for Saint Vincent and the Grenadines
Male marathon runners
Competitors at the 2006 Central American and Caribbean Games
Competitors at the 2010 Central American and Caribbean Games
Saint Vincent and the Grenadines sports coaches
Athletics (track and field) coaches